Puerto Ferro Light, also known as Faro de Puerto Ferro, is a historic lighthouse located in the Vieques, Puerto Rico. The light was first lit in 1896. It is one of the last minor or local lights to be built by the Spanish government. The light was of crucial importance to cross the Vieques Passage. The lighthouse was deactivated in 1926 when it was abandoned.

During World War II, the United States military purchased about two thirds of Vieques as an extension to the Puerto Rican mainland's Roosevelt Roads Naval Station, including the area surrounding the Puerto Ferro Lighthouse. The US Navy continued to use the island for military exercises after the war. After a series of protests starting in 1999, the U.S. military ended the use of its facilities on the island in 2003. The Puerto Ferro Lighthouse is now part of the Vieques National Wildlife Refuge.

Although in poor condition and completely sealed in by brick or concrete, the structure is a good example of official neo-classic minor lighthouse style. The lighthouse is now open to the public, accessible by a gravel road which is immediately to the right of the gate upon entering the Refuge.

See also
 Punta Mulas Light: also built in 1896 on Vieques
 List of lighthouses in Puerto Rico

References

External links

Historic American Engineering Record in Puerto Rico
Lighthouses completed in 1896
Lighthouses in Puerto Rico
Vieques, Puerto Rico
1896 establishments in the Spanish Empire
1890s establishments in Puerto Rico
Neoclassical architecture in Puerto Rico